Karim Chammari (born 5 March 1966) is a Tunisian windsurfer. He competed in the men's Lechner A-390 event at the 1992 Summer Olympics.

References

External links
 
 

1966 births
Living people
Tunisian windsurfers
Tunisian male sailors (sport)
Olympic sailors of Tunisia
Sailors at the 1992 Summer Olympics – Lechner A-390
Place of birth missing (living people)